Crumrod is an unincorporated community in Phillips County, Arkansas, United States. Crumrod has a post office with ZIP code 72328.

References

Unincorporated communities in Phillips County, Arkansas
Unincorporated communities in Arkansas